This is an overview of the gold medalist relay teams in swimming at the Olympics and the World Aquatics Championships. These tournaments are the only global long course (50-meter pool) swimming championships organized by world swimming federation FINA. This list gives an overview of the dominant swimming nations throughout the history of swimming.

Currently, the Olympic program includes six relay events (three for men, three for women), and the World Championships program eight (three for men, three for women, two mixed). These numbers were lower in the past, as shown in the table.

Flags link to the country. Names of countries link to the event article. Use the sort function in the left-hand column to separate Olympics and World Championships.

Note: Only events that are presently contested have their own column in the above table. In the early Olympics, two team events have been held that were discontinued later on; the men's 200-meter team race in 1900, and the men's 4 × 50 yard relay in 1904. These events have been located in a column corresponding to the most similar event and the nearest distance, respectively.

Medal table 

Italics denotes countries that no longer exist. OG = Olympic Games, WC = World Aquatics Championships. Sorted for 1) total titles, 2) Olympic titles, 3) year of first title.

See also 
List of individual gold medalists in swimming at the Olympics and World Aquatics Championships (men)
List of individual gold medalists in swimming at the Olympics and World Aquatics Championships (women)
List of Olympic medalists in swimming (men)
List of Olympic medalists in swimming (women)
List of World Aquatics Championships medalists in swimming (men)
List of World Aquatics Championships medalists in swimming (women)

References 
HistoFINA Swimming Medallists And Statistics At Olympic Games, January 31, 2015
HistoFINA Swimming Medallists And Statistics At FINA World Championships (50m), December 3, 2015
Sports-reference Olympic medalists

Gold medalist relay teams
Swimming statistics